The Upper Lusatian house or Umgebindehaus is a special type of house that combines log house, timber-framing and building stone methods of construction. It is especially common in the region running from Silesia through Upper Lusatia and North Bohemia and into Saxon Switzerland, as well as East Thuringia.

Characteristics 
The Upper Lusatian house is defined by the constructional separation of its living area from the roof, or its living area from the upper story and roof. The main characteristic of the normal type is "a wooden support system, which runs around the living area of the house made of logs or boards, which has the job of freeing the frame of the living area from the weight of the roof (in single-storey houses) or the roof and upper storey (in two-storey houses)."

Upper Lusatian houses are transversely divided Middle German houses or Ernhäuser. The hallway runs transversely across the house and separates the ground floor into living and working areas. The living area or Blockstube is usually located at the eastern or southern gable end in order to protect it from damp. The working area, of solid construction (usually rubble stone) is located opposite the Blockstube. This is where the animal stalls or stables, store rooms and barn are housed. A building in which the solid section is replaced by another Blockstube is known as a Doppelstubenhaus ("double living area house").

Above the Blockstube (Handweberstube) the upper storey or roof rests on wooden posts that are stabilised by triangulation with jetty brackets (Knagge) or braces (Kopfverbund). It is thus independent of the carrying elements below it and may be freely worked on. The upper storey is usually of timber framed construction. By contrast, especially in North Bohemia, the upper storey is made of log cabin construction.

Gallery

References

Bibliography 
Manfred Hammer: Bauernhäuser, Bauernhöfe, Dörfer. Historisch wertvolle Gebäude und Dorfanlagen im Kreis Löbau-Zittau. Verein Ländliche Bauwerte in Sachsen e.V., Dresden 2009
Jürgen Cieslak (Hrsg.): Umgebinde : eine einzigartige Bauweise im Dreiländereck Deutschland - Polen - Tschechien. Sächsischer Verein für Volksbauweise e.V., Langewiesche, Königstein i. Ts. 2007, 
Karl Bernert: Umgebindehäuser. VEB Verlag für Bauwesen, Berlin 1988, 
Frank Delitz: Umgebinde im Überblick : Zu Fragen der Geschichte, Verbreitung und landschaftlichen Ausprägung einer Volksbauweise. Graph. Werk. Zittau, Zittau 1987
Karl Bernert, Jürgen Cieslak: Wir wohnen in einem Umgebindehaus : Arbeitsmaterial zur Erhaltung u. sachgemäßen Pflege d. Umgebindebauweise in d. Oberlausitz. Ges. für Denkmalpflege im Kulturbund d. DDR, Dresden 1982

External links

 www.umgebindeland.de
 www.fachring-umgebindehaus.eu
 www.stiftung-umgebindehaus.de
 https://www.quick-garden.co.uk/
 Umgebindehaus information centre of Zittau/Görlitz College -  University of Applied Sciences
 Agnieszka Gaczkowska, Traditional Upper Lusatian Umgebinde House: Modern Reinterpretation. A detailed paper in English.
 Jack Breen: The Umgebinde Variations: A case-based study of formal typologies and systematic compositional variety. Form & Media Studies department, Faculty of Architecture, Delft University of Technology.

Houses in Germany
Wooden houses
Vernacular architecture
Architecture in Germany
House styles
Farmhouses
Houses in the Czech Republic
Log houses
Timber framing